The ISLRN or International Standard Language Resource Number is Persistent Unique Identifier for Language Resources.

Context 
On November 18, 2013, 12 major organisations (see list below) from the fields Language Resources and Technologies, Computational Linguistics, and Digital Humanities held a cooperation meeting in Paris (France) and agreed to announce the establishment of the International Standard Language Resource Number (ISLRN), to be assigned to each Language Resource.

Among the 12 organisations, 4 institutions constitute the ISLRN Steering Committee (ST)

 ADHO
 ACL
 Asian Federation of Natural Language Processing ST
 COCOSDA, International Committee for the Coordination & Standardisation of Speech Databases and Assessment Techniques
 ICCL (COLING)
 European Data Forum
 ELRA ST
 IAMT, International Association for Machine Translation 
 ISCA
 LDC ST
 [www.cocosda.org Oriental COCOSDA] ST
 RMA, Language Resource Management Agency

Size and Content 
The Joint Research Centre(JRC), the [European Commission]'s in-house science   service, was the first organisation to adopt the ISLRN initiative and requested. 
2500 resources and tools have already been allocated an ISLRN. These resources include written data (Annotated corpus, Annotated text, List of misspelled word, Terminological database, Treebank, Wordnet, etc.) and speech corpora (Synthesised Speech, Transcripts and Audiovisual Recordings, Conversational Speech, Folk Sayings, etc.)

Objectives 
Providing Language Resources with unique names and identifiers using a standardized nomenclature ensures the identification of each Language Resources and streamlines the citation with proper references in activities within Human Language Technology as well as in documents and scientific publications. Such unique identifier also enhances the reproducibility, an essential feature of scientific work.

References

External links 

 ISLRN Portal

Natural language processing